Diplodactylus granariensis, sometimes called the western stone gecko, wheat-belt stone gecko, or the giant stone gecko, is a gecko endemic to Australia.

References

Diplodactylus
Reptiles described in 1979
Taxa named by Glen Milton Storr
Geckos of Australia